Djamel Eddine Benlamri (born 25 December 1989) is an Algerian professional footballer who plays as a centre-back the Algeria national team.

Club career
On 29 May 2009, Benlamri joined NA Hussein Dey, signing a three year contract with the club.

Free agent Benlamri signed with Ligue 1 club Olympique Lyonnais in October 2020 on a one-year contract with the option of a second. It was his first European move. Lyon had previously sold Marçal to Wolverhampton Wanderers, loaned Joachim Andersen to Fulham and lost Marcelo to injury.

On 20 June 2022, Benlamri joined Saudi Arabian club Al-Khaleej. On 12 January 2023, Benlamri and Al-Khaleej agreed to end their contract mutually.

International career
On 16 November 2011, Benlamri was selected as part of Algeria's squad for the 2011 CAF U-23 Championship in Morocco.

On 12 May 2012, he was called up for the first time to the Algeria national team for the 2014 FIFA World Cup qualifiers against Mali and Rwanda, and the return leg of the 2013 Africa Cup of Nations qualifier against Gambia. However, he had to withdraw from the squad due to injury. He made his debut for his country on 18 November 2018 in an Africa Cup of Nations qualifier against Togo, as a starter.

He was a member of the squad that won the 2019 Africa Cup of Nations and 2021 FIFA Arab Cup in the final of the competition.

Career statistics

Club

International

Honours
Algeria
FIFA Arab Cup: 2021
 Africa Cup of Nations: 2019

References

External links
 

1989 births
Living people
Association football defenders
Algerian footballers
Algeria international footballers
Algeria under-23 international footballers
Algeria youth international footballers
2011 CAF U-23 Championship players
2019 Africa Cup of Nations players
2021 Africa Cup of Nations players
21st-century Algerian people
Algerian Ligue Professionnelle 1 players
Algerian Ligue 2 players
Saudi Professional League players
Ligue 1 players
Qatar Stars League players
NA Hussein Dey players
JS Kabylie players
ES Sétif players
Al-Shabab FC (Riyadh) players
Olympique Lyonnais players
Qatar SC players
Khaleej FC players
Algerian expatriate footballers
Algerian expatriate sportspeople in France
Algerian expatriate sportspeople in Qatar
Algerian expatriate sportspeople in Saudi Arabia
Expatriate footballers in France
Expatriate footballers in Qatar
Expatriate footballers in Saudi Arabia
Footballers from Algiers